Hale is a surname. Lords of Loddon-Hales, Hale or "De Halys" trace back to Lord Roger De Halys circa 1130; his descendant Lord Roger De Halys married Alice Scrogins circa 1275, and their daughter Alice Hale married Thomas of Brotherton, 1st Earl of Norfolk, the son of Edward I of England. Those who were the ancestors of William Hale who married Rose Bond of Kingswaldenbury, their grandson George Hale (a drummer) came to America on the ship "Supply" in 1620, where he lived with the governor Sir Francis Wyatt of Virginia. Other Hale descendants also use the noble title Earl of Tenterden, Viscount of Tinsdall and the Baronets Of Beakesbourne and Coventry. Many Armorial achievements have also been used by Hale descendants. It is said that the Hales were related to Saint Edmund, King of East Anglia in which the Hales get their Arrows pointing downward in their coat of arms.

Notable people with the surname
Alan Hale (disambiguation), several people
Albert Hale (1950–2021), American politician
Albert W. Hale (1882–1947) American film director
Alfie Hale, Irish footballer and manager
Alison Hale (born 1954/1955), New Zealand painter
Amanda Hale (born 1982), British actress
Amanda K. Hale, Canadian writer
Angelica Hale, American child singer
Artemas Hale (1783–1882), American politician
Barbara Hale (1922–2017), American actress
Bob Hale (philosopher) (1945–2017), British philosopher
Brenda Hale, Baroness Hale of Richmond, justice of the Supreme Court of the UK
Calvin Henry Hale (1818–1887), early settler and politician in Washington Territory
Cerys Hale (born 1993), Welsh rugby union player
Chanin Hale, (1928 – 2020),  American actress 
Charles Hale (1831–1882), legislator in the Massachusetts state House and Senate
Charles R. Hale (bishop) (1837–1900), coadjutor bishop of Springfield, Illinois
Chris Hale, professional American football defensive back of the 1980s and 1990s in the National Football League
Christopher Hale, British non-fiction writer and documentary producer
Christopher Hale (rugby league), rugby league footballer of the 1980s
Clive Hale (1937–2005), Australian TV presenter
Damian Hale (born 1969), Australian politician
Daniel Hale (disambiguation), several people named Daniel or Danny
David Hale (disambiguation), several people
DeMarlo Hale (born 1961), American baseball coach
Denzil Hale (1928–2004), English footballer
DeWitt Hale (1917–2018), American lawyer and politician
Dorothy Hale (1905–1938), American socialite
Edward Hale (disambiguation), several people
Elizabeth Amherst Hale (1774 – 1826), Canadian artist
Enoch Hale, New Hampshire Militia officer during the American Revolutionary War and brother of Lieutenant Nathan Hale
Eugene Hale (1836–1918), United States Senator from Maine (Rep)
Franc Hale (American actress) (1905/1906-1986)
Frederick Hale (1874–1963), U.S. Senator from Maine
Gareth Hale, British comedian (Hale & Pace)
George Ellery Hale, astronomer
George Ernest Hale (1884–1966), Unitarian minister in Adelaide, Australia
Harold Hale, Australian cricketer
Helene Hale (1918–2013), American politician
Henry S. Hale, 19th-century Philadelphia businessman
Irving Hale, American general in the Spanish-American and Philippine-American Wars
Jen Hale (born 1978), American journalist and sportscaster
Jennifer Hale, American voice actress
John Hale (disambiguation), several people
Jonathan Hale (1891–1966), Canadian-born actor in film and television
Leon Hale (1921–2021), American journalist and author
Lucy Hale (born 1989), American actress and singer
Lzzy Hale (born 1983), American singer, musician, and songwriter
Mary Whitwell Hale (1810–1862), American teacher, school founder, hymnwriter
Mason Hale (1929–1990), American lichenologist
Matthew Hale (disambiguation), several people
Mike Hale, American motorcycle rider
Minnie Anderson Hale, American lawyer
Nathan Hale (disambiguation), several people
Owen Hale, American musician
Philip Henry Hale (1850–1927), British-born American newspaper publisher, rancher, and music composer
Robert Hale (disambiguation), several people named Robert or Bob
Ruth Hale (disambiguation), several people
Ryan Hale (born 1975), American football player
Sarah Josepha Hale, American writer
Shannon Hale (born 1974), American author
Sylvia Hale, Australian politician
Tony Hale (born 1970), American actor
Una Hale (1922–2005), Australian operatic soprano
Walter Hale (1870−1956), Gloucestershire and Somerset cricketer
Warren Hale, several people
William Hale (disambiguation), several people

Fictional characters
Cornelia Hale, character from W.I.T.C.H.
Daniel Hale, character from Prison Break
David Hale (Sons of Anarchy), the Deputy Chief in Sons of Anarchy
Derek Hale, Laura Hale, Talia Hale, Peter Hale, Cora Hale, and Malia (Hale) Tate, characters from the MTV cult television series Teen Wolf (2011 TV series)
Jasper Hale and Rosalie Hale, characters from Twilight (novel series) novel series
John Hale, character from The Crucible
Margaret Hale, heroine of North and South
Steve Hale, character from Full House
Saxton Hale, character from Team Fortress 2

See also
Hale (given name)
Hale (disambiguation)
Haile (surname)

References

Sir Bernard Burke. The General Armory of England, Scotland, Wales; Comprising A Registry of Armorial Bearings From the Earliest To the Present Time. London, England: Harrison, 59, Pall Mall, 1884.
 British History
 Hales

English-language surnames